Long Way to Go may refer to:

"Long Way to Go" (Alan Jackson song), 2011
"Long Way to Go" (Andrew Stockdale song), 2013
"Long Way to Go" (Gwen Stefani and André 3000 song), 2004
"Long Way to Go" (Stevie Nicks song), 1989
"Long Way 2 Go", a song by Cassie, 2006
"Long Way to Go", a song by Alice Cooper from Love It to Death, 1971
"Long Way to Go", a song by Ben Folds from So There, 2015
"Long Way to Go", a song by Josh Gracin from Redemption, 2011

See also
"Long, Long Way to Go", a 2003 song by Def Leppard